Chadstone Shopping Centre (colloquially known as Chaddy) is a super regional shopping centre located in the south-eastern Melbourne suburb of Malvern East. Chadstone Shopping Centre is the biggest shopping centre in Australia and one of the biggest in the Southern Hemisphere. The centre opened on 3 October 1960 and was the first self-contained regional shopping centre in Melbourne.

The centre contains 129,924m2 of shop floor space, about 530 stores and more than 9300 free car parking spaces. It has as many as 68,000 visitors on its busiest trading days and attracts about 400,000 tourists a year from interstate and 200,000 from overseas. Sales at the centre exceed $1.4 billion—the highest turnover of all Australian shopping centres—and it has more than 20 million visitors annually.

The centre, also known colloquially as "Chaddy", includes anchor stores such as the Myer and David Jones department stores, H&M, Zara and Uniqlo (opened late 2016 as part of a renovation), Coles, Woolworths and Aldi supermarkets, as well as Kmart and Target discount department stores, JB Hi-Fi, and more than 500 specialty stores, of which the majority are fashion-related, including numerous high-end labels like Dior, Chanel, Louis Vuitton, Tiffany & Co and More. Also located in the centre is an Apple Store, a Tesla dealership and Legoland Discovery Centre with a Lego Store and Hoyts. There are two food courts, two office towers located at the southern side of the centre and a newly built hotel. 
The centre's owners had sought a further expansion to include a 250-room hotel and 15,000m2 of offices (including its owner Vicinity Centres Head Office), to take total floor space to 221,217m2, including 156,924m2 of shop floor space. Construction of the $130 million building started in early 2018 and opened to the public in late 2019.

History

Origins

Opened in October 1960 at a cost of £6 million, Chadstone Shopping Centre was the first self-contained regional shopping centre in Melbourne, and the largest built in Australia to that time. The centre was built and owned by the Myer Emporium, and marked the transformation of shopping in Australia from the traditional central city and strip-shopping precincts to the now familiar mall-type shopping centre.

The site of the current shopping centre was once extensive paddocks of the Convent of the Good Shepherd on which cattle grazed until the mid-1950s. The initial  of land was sold to Myer in March 1958.

The development of Chadstone was driven by Ken Myer, who in 1949 looked to the US for the lead in retail developments, with decentralised centres fuelled by expanding suburban growth and car reliance. Further development of the concept occurred after Myer's 1953 visit to the US, where he met with a number of architects involved with the design of shopping malls, and in 1954 Myer secured  of land in Burwood for a shopping centre. The Burwood site was ultimately not used for the project.

In 1958 the American firm of Welton Becket and Associates was appointed as the design architect, with Tompkins and Shaw Architects as the production architect. During the project the senior board of Myer was unhappy with the process, concerned that the architects did not understand the "Australian Concept", and were blindly adopting the American shopping mall model.

In 1960 the Myer board wrote:

"Although based in a broad way on the pattern of shopping centres in the United States, Chadstone has been individually designed to suit local needs and its own location."

The original shopping centre consisted of a single open-air mall with Myer at the southern end and a Dickins New World supermarket at the northern end; following the US pattern of shopping malls.

Early years

The first major change was made to the centre in the 1970s or 1980s: the mall was roofed over with translucent fibreglass, an acknowledgement that the open mall did not suit the Melbourne climate. During the same period a bowling alley and auditorium were opened, and the Dickens store was altered to be more easily accessed from the mall.

In the early 1980s, the Myer Emporium sold the shopping centre to the Gandel Group, which has since managed and developed the complex. 

In 1984 the centre had its first major expansion: in 1985 now Coles New World was relocated into a new mall and a Target Discount Department Store was relocated from downstairs to a new store where Coles used to be, and in 1986 a Hoyts 8 Cinema Complex was opened. A major extension doubled the lettable area in the late 1980s, and during the same era the Convent of the Good Shepherd was demolished to extend the carpark of the complex.

Redevelopments

Chadstone has reclaimed the title "Southern hemisphere's largest shopping centre" since 2009 and also "Australia's largest shopping centre" since 2007, thanks to regular development. Westfield Knox (Knox City Shopping Centre at the time) held the latter title from November 2002 until 2007 after the completion of their own expansion works. Chadstone initially held both of these titles from its original opening day to 2002 and was quickly inspired to take back the records. Chadstone's main local rivals are Westfield Doncaster to the north, Westfield Knox to the east and Westfield Southland to the south.

Pre–2007
Throughout the 1990s, Chadstone had undergone numerous developments. These include the development of multi-storey carparks due to the boundaries of the centre being built-up with no further room to expand. Approximately 20% of the original mall structure is left intact with this number to be reduced due to the construction of the West Mall.

By 1999 Chadstone's lettable area covered 126,000m2, after the extension of the Myer and David Jones stores. Part of stages 20 and 21, this expansion cost $150 million and took two and a half years to complete. Probuild was responsible for every major stage of expansion and redevelopment at Chadstone Shopping Centre, commencing at stage 5 in 1989, with stage 33 (West Mall) having been completed in 2009.

2007–2009
In December 2007 a A$100 million upgrade saw the centre's owners extend Chadstone's lettable area to 171,217 m2, with the centre reclaiming the title as the largest shopping centre in Australia. 

The new extension, dubbed "Chadstone Place", featured a Woolworths Supermarket (the first Woolworth supermarket in Victoria to have the new branding and relocated), First Choice Liquor, Aldi and a Dick Smith Electronics Concept Store along with an airport-style waiting area bus interchange, two new health clubs (Contours and Fitness First Platinum) and a crèche. On 29 October 2007 the first section of the redevelopment was open. Named "The Loop Mall", it featured 44 new stores including a redesigned Jetty Surf and new entrances opposite Kmart and Toys 'R' Us.

The last major redevelopment, commencing in early 2007, impacted on almost a quarter of the centre, (the oldest section of the centre, from Sportsgirl to Mrs. Field's/Borders, being closed), from 31 May 2008, until November 2009.

The development also included redesigning the roads leading into Chadstone to allow for better traffic flow into the centre. As part of the development an independent community group launched and maintained a website to keep track of construction developments. The State Government refused to impose a condition sought by the Stonnington Council calling for a transport study by the Government and Gandel, including the possible construction of a rail link.

On 22 August 2009, 50 new stores, including Sportsgirl, Portmans, Esprit, Witchery, were opened. In November, a golden strip of luxury retailers were officially opened. Twelve international fashion houses now have stores at Chadstone including Louis Vuitton, Gucci, Prada, Chanel, Miu Miu, Tiffany & Co., Ralph Lauren, Hugo Boss, Omega, Burberry, Coach and Jimmy Choo. The expansion provided a total of 530 stores.

2011–present

On 20 August 2011, managing director of Colonial First State Global Asset Management, Darren Steinberg, announced a proposal to expand Chadstone's floor area to 221,217m², to enable a redevelopment of the oldest part of the property to the north and construct two buildings of up to 14 storeys on its southern boundary facing Princes Highway. Up to 60,000 m2 of floor area would be revamped and an extra 27,000 m2 added to the centre. The proposal includes refurbishments of the cinemas and food precincts. An extra 1400 car-parking spaces are proposed for the centre, taking total car spaces to 10,708. The project, scheduled to be completed in late 2015 at a cost of A$520 million, will be the biggest non-retail extension in the centre's history. The redevelopment plans were supported by an independent planning panel in July 2012 and approved by the City of Stonnington on 14 August 2012. On 10 November 2012, the centre's redevelopment plans were given the final approval from the State Government.

The CFS Retail and Gandel Group boards gave the go-ahead for part of the works in May 2014, which would add 34,000 square metres to a total of 212,000 sq m. The west mall would be "revitalised" with an expanded luxury section, while work at the northern end would create a new retail and leisure precinct accommodating a Hoyts digital cinema complex, up to five international flagship stores in 11,000 sq m of space, 40 new retailers and a 1300-seat, 26-tenant food gallery. The northern expansion, including a new Target store on the lower ground floor, would be accommodated within a four-level glass-roofed atrium. The expansion would also include a 17,000 sq m 10-level office tower, new bus interchange and an additional 800 car park spaces, taking total car spaces to 10,090. The new northern extension would create "racecourse" style malls running around the centre on both the Ground and Lower Ground floors. Demolition began in June 2014 and construction in September 2014, with staged openings through to completion on 13 October 2016.

This extension opened in October 2016, and was marketed as "The New Chadstone". The renovated section includes many global brands such as H&M, Sephora, Uniqlo, and many others

Legoland Discovery Centre indoor theme park was later announced to open as part of the new development. This is the first Lego themed attraction for Merlin Entertainments in the Southern Hemisphere. It opened on 18 April 2017.

Construction on the 250-room M Gallery by Sofitel hotel began in May 2018 with completion expected in late 2019.

Revenue and profit
Chadstone Shopping Centre was the first shopping centre in Australia to have its total worth valued at more than A$1 billion. Chadstone Shopping Centre's net income was $970 million in 2004. Its annual profit in (2004) was A$79.03 million, with its entirety of stores gaining an income of A$119.23 million. In 2004, Chadstone Shopping Centre had an Annual Traffic Movement of 16.7 million moving through the centre.

In 2007, the annual turnover was A$1 billion, making it the shopping centre in Australia with the highest annual turnover and the first to have an annual turnover of A$1 billion.

In 2010, Chadstone had a 20% increase in the moving annual turnover (MAT), making A$1.28 billion in sales that year.

The centre reported an annual turnover for 2013 of $1.4 billion, an increase of 3 percent on the previous year, making it the shopping centre with the highest turnover in Australia. The next biggest was Westfield Bondi Junction, with $1 billion turnover. As of 2013, the centre's value exceeds A$3 billion.

Transport and road congestion

Chadstone Shopping Centre was designed as a car-based centre when this was the norm and it remains highly dependent on cars for customer access. The centre has more than 9300 car parking spaces and the proportion of staff and customers arriving by car continues to grow: between 2002 and 2011 the share of customers arriving by bus fell sharply from 17% to 12%, while the proportion of those walking or cycling fell from 5% to 3%. Planners now acknowledge it would be a major challenge to reverse the trend.

The independent planning panel that in 2012 reviewed Stonnington Council's proposed C154 planning scheme amendment relating to Chadstone's expansion plans said the centre contributed to "significant traffic issues" in the area, with traffic on nearby major arterial networks heavily congested and intersections "close to saturated at peak times". The panel's report said problems also arose from overflow parking in nearby streets at peak times such as Christmas and major sales, and that the local community had expressed concerns that future growth at Chadstone would worsen the problem. The panel concluded that the ability to further expand floor space would be limited unless road capacity was enhanced through major arterial roadworks and a substantial shift in the mode of transport for visitors and staff.

Traffic congestion also impacts on the 14 bus routes that service the shopping centre, including two higher frequency SmartBus routes (Routes 900 and 903). Buses often take 15 minutes to travel to or from Holmesglen, 1.8 km away. Services for many bus routes are infrequent after hours and on weekends.

The nearest railway stations are at Hughesdale and Oakleigh on the Cranbourne/Pakenham lines and Holmesglen and East Malvern on the Glen Waverley line. Hughesdale station is about 20 minutes' walk from the shopping centre; Holmesglen is about 30 minutes. Submissions to the 2012 planning panel by the PTUA and Town and Country Planning Authority (TCPA) supported an extension of the Alamein railway line to Oakleigh railway station via Chadstone for either light or heavy rail services and the RACV has also asked the state government to consider providing an underground rail link. Stonnington Council has proposed a Municipal Strategic Statement and Local Planning Policy in which it would seek a fixed rail link to Chadstone Shopping Centre. State government transport authority Public Transport Victoria also views a rail link to Chadstone as desirable, but says the cost of building one would be "prohibitive".

Tenants
Chadstone Shopping Centre has 211,929m² of floor space, comprising 550 stores over four levels serviced by over 10,000 car spaces. The major retailers, which are located at either end of the centre, include David Jones, Myer, H&M, Sephora, Uniqlo, Zara, Muji, Apple, Target, Kmart, Cotton On, Woolworths, Coles, Aldi, Rebel Sport, JB Hi-Fi, Strike Bowling Bar, Legoland Discovery Centre and Hoyts Cinema.

References

Notes

External links

Landmarks in Melbourne
Shopping centres in Melbourne
Shopping malls established in 1960
1960 establishments in Australia
Buildings and structures in the City of Stonnington